Petunia inflata is a species of flowering plant in the family Solanaceae, native to Paraguay, northeastern Argentina, and southern Brazil. It is a member of the Petunia integrifolia clade, and is one of the parents of the garden petunia, Petunia × atkinsiana (formerly Petunia × hybrida). It is also widely used in laboratory studies of the S-RNase mechanism of self-incompatibility in plants.

References

inflata
Flora of Paraguay
Flora of Northeast Argentina
Flora of South Brazil
Plants described in 1911